Seated Lincoln is a 1911 sculpture by Gutzon Borglum, located next to the Essex County Veterans Courthouse in Newark, Essex County, New Jersey. It was added to the National Register of Historic Places on March 30, 1995, for its significance in art.

History and description
The bronze sculpture depicts Abraham Lincoln larger than life size, seated at one end of a bench also cast in bronze.  Lincoln is bearded but bare headed, with his stovepipe hat resting on the bench beside the man's hand.  The bronze is set on a low stone platform with five steps, beside the steps to the courthouse.  The informal composition was an unusual departure from the usual monumental depiction of Lincoln standing or enthroned on a high plinth.  It was inspired by Borglum's research, reading that Lincoln often sat alone on a bench in the White House garden to gather his thoughts during the American Civil War, particularly when there was bad news. In 1908, Borgulm had completed the marble bust of Lincoln which is now installed at the U.S. Capitol, and he later sculpted the heads of four U.S. presidents including Lincoln at Mount Rushmore. 

The work was funded by a $25,000 bequest by Newark businessman Amos Hoagland Van Horn, who died in 1908.  Van Horn's estate also funded Borglum's Wars of America monument, erected in Newark in 1926.

The sculpture was cast at the Gorham Manufacturing Company foundry in New York, and dedicated by President Theodore Roosevelt on Memorial Day, May 30 1911.  Roosevelt reportedly exclaimed "Why this doesn't look like a monument at all!" which Borglum took as a compliment. The sculpture was restored in 1980 by the Cavalier Renaissance Foundry of Bridgeport, Connecticut. 

Borglum also made a number of smaller bronze maquettes of the statue.  One example, was sold at Sotheby's in 2009 for $62,500, and another in 2016 for $100,000.

See also
Lincoln the Mystic
Wars of America
List of statues of Abraham Lincoln
National Register of Historic Places listings in Essex County, New Jersey
List of sculptures of presidents of the United States

References

External links
 

Buildings and structures completed in 1911
Culture of Newark, New Jersey
Statues of Abraham Lincoln
Outdoor sculptures in New Jersey
1911 sculptures
Bronze sculptures in New Jersey
National Register of Historic Places in Newark, New Jersey
Statues in New Jersey
1911 establishments in New Jersey
Sculptures of men in New Jersey
New Jersey Register of Historic Places
Monuments and memorials to Abraham Lincoln in the United States
Sculptures by Gutzon Borglum
Public art in Newark, New Jersey